Wests NZ is a manufacturer of soft drinks and cordials based in Dunedin, New Zealand.  It is the oldest continuous manufacturer of soft drinks in New Zealand.

History 

Wests began production in 1876 when Tom West created a range of cordials in the back of his grocery store in Maclaggan Street, Dunedin. These proved popular with the city' early settlers and provided growth for the fledgling business. Production expanded to include ginger beer in 1906, and in 1914 a purpose-built factory was constructed in Saint Kilda in the south of the city, which is still in use today.

Products 

Wests today produces soft drinks and cordials in a range of flavours, many of them unique to the brand. These include Chocolade (chocolate-flavoured lemonade), RedZenergy (Energy drink), Cola and Raspberry, and the famous Pineapple and Pear. Wests also produce Milkshake and slushy syrups as well as Postmix concentrates and Soda Syrup refills in a large variety of flavours.

Sugar Free 

Many of Wests regular Soft Drink flavours are also offered in Sugar Free varieties which has led to the company offering New Zealands largest range of Sugar Free Softdrinks. Perfectly suitable for diabetics, Diet Milkshake as well as Soda Syrup flavours have recently also been added to the companies Sugar Free Range.

Factory shop 

Located next to the production factory, Wests' Factory shop offers the range of Wests' products as well as general convenience store products. In addition, an R18 section offers a variety of alcoholic products.

See also
Foxton fizz

External links
Wests New Zealand Limited

Beverage companies of New Zealand
Companies based in Dunedin
New Zealand drinks